The 1997 Miami Hurricanes football team represented the University of Miami during the 1997 NCAA Division I-A football season. It was the Hurricanes' 72nd season of football and seventh as a member of the Big East Conference. The Hurricanes were led by third-year head coach Butch Davis and played their home games at the Orange Bowl. They finished the season 5–6 overall and 3-4 in the Big East to finish in a three-way tie for fifth place.

Schedule

References

Miami
Miami Hurricanes football seasons
Miami Hurricanes football